Ricki Lloyd Herbert  (born 10 April 1961) is a New Zealand former footballer and manager. He is the current technical director at Cambridge FC.

Herbert was formerly head coach of the New Zealand national team, stepping down after the side failed to qualify for the 2014 FIFA World Cup. Herbert represented his country at the 1982 FIFA World Cup in Spain and coached the New Zealand national team at the 2010 FIFA World Cup, famously leading them through the tournament unbeaten. His most recent role in international football was as the head coach of the Maldives national football team.

Playing career
Herbert represented New Zealand at age group level, playing for the New Zealand under-20 side and gained 61 full international caps from 1980 to 1989, scoring seven goals.

Herbert made his full international début in a 4–0 win over Mexico on 20 August 1980 at the age of 18, and featured in all 15 matches of the All Whites' World Cup qualifying campaign for the 1982 FIFA World Cup in Spain. Herbert was a substitute for the loss against Scotland, but was reinstated to the starting eleven for both Soviet Union and Brazil as New Zealand failed to claim any points in their first World Cup finals appearance.

At club level, he represented a number of teams in his homeland and played in the Australian league. He had his greatest success with Mt Wellington AFC where he won three league championships during two spells with the club and two Chatham Cup triumphs.

In 1982 Herbert spent some time in England at Southampton F.C., where he made a few appearances for the reserve team and one disastrous friendly appearance for the first team. He also had a spell in English football with Wolverhampton Wanderers from 1984 to 1986, where he made 49 appearances in total. He was signed by manager Tommy Docherty who had previously coached Herbert while manager of Sydney Olympic. However, his time at the club coincided with them sliding down the leagues; Herbert was part of the team relegated to the third tier in 1985, but left in March 1986 shortly before a successive relegation after falling out with new manager Sammy Chapman.

Coaching career

Early career
Herbert began his coaching career at Papakura City AFC in 1990, before taking over at neighbouring Papatoetoe AFC in 1993. From 1996 he took charge of Central United in the National Summer League, finishing mid table in his first season in charge. In both 1997 and 1998, Herbert took Central United to victory in the Chatham Cup and finished a close second in the league. In 1999, New Zealand reverted to separate North Island and South Island leagues, with the winners of each playing off for title of New Zealand Champion. Central United, winners of the North Island Soccer League, defeated the South Island winner, Dunedin Technical, 3–1, after extra time, in the championship final.

New Zealand

Oly-Whites and U17
Herbert's domestic success attracted attention from NZ football association, and in 1999 he was appointed coach of the under-23 Oly-Whites qualifying campaign for the Sydney Olympics. An appointment of assistant national coach followed in 2001. In 2003 Herbert took charge of the New Zealand U-17 team.

As Director of Technical Development, Herbert was again responsible for New Zealand Olympic campaign in 2004, although they failed to qualify for the finals in Athens.

National team
Herbert was appointed All Whites coach on 25 February 2005, replacing Mick Waitt after being his assistant since 2003, with his first game in charge being scheduled in June that year as a friendly against archrival Australia.
As national coach, the All Whites won their first match in Europe when beating Georgia 3–1 in Germany in May 2006. On that tour, which included a 4–0 loss to Brazil, the All Whites drew 1–1 with Estonia in Tallinn.
Herbert was honoured New Zealand Coach of the Year for 2007. Herbert led the New Zealand national football team to the victory in the 2008 OFC Nations Cup, qualifying for the 2009 FIFA Confederations Cup in South Africa. Herbert is the second manager and only New Zealander to take New Zealand to the FIFA World Cup for a second time when his side qualified for the 2010 FIFA World Cup by winning World Cup qualifying play-off against Bahrain.
On 15 June 2010, New Zealand drew 1–1 with Slovakia in their opening match in the World Cup Finals. This was their first ever point at a World Cup Finals and was earned when Winston Reid headed home a dramatic injury-time equaliser. Herbert described the draw as the "best ever result" for the New Zealand national team. In New Zealand's second game in the tournament, they held reigning world champions Italy to a memorable draw.
The All Whites' third game of the 2010 FIFA World Cup was against Paraguay. The outcome was a nil-all draw, meaning New Zealand did not advance to the second round. New Zealand ended up becoming the only 'undefeated' team in the tournament.

Herbert announced his retirement following the All Whites' 4–2 loss to Mexico in November 2013, failing to qualify for the 2014 World Cup.

New Zealand Knights
In December 2006, after FFA announced that it had revoked the 2006 season A-League licence held by the Knights' owners, Herbert took over the reins of the now defunct New Zealand Knights under an arrangement between the FFA and NZ Soccer whereby the national body would step in to manage the club to meet their commitments for the remaining five games of the season. In that time the franchise won three matches, drew one and lost to competition winners Melbourne Victory.

Wellington Phoenix
In 2007 the new A-League franchise, Wellington Phoenix was granted a three-year license, and owner Terry Serepisos and Herbert immediately confirmed as head coach. On 26 February 2013, Herbert resigned from his role as head coach and took on an advisory role within the club.

NorthEast United FC (India)
On 19 August 2014, he was named as the manager of NorthEast United FC in the inaugural Indian Super League. On 13 October 2014, the team won their first ISL match at the Indira Gandhi Stadium, Spaniard Koke scoring the only goal of the game to defeat the Kerala Blasters.

2014 FIFA World Cup (Brazil)
Herbert was appointed to FIFA's Technical Study Group to analyse tactical and technical dimensions of play at the 2014 FIFA World Cup in Brazil.

Papua New Guinea
In July 2015, Herbert coached the Papua New Guinea Under 23 side to a bronze medal at the 2015 Pacific Games in Port Moresby, Papua New Guinea.

Maldives
Herbert was appointed head coach of the Maldives on 9 September 2015. He sought an early termination to his two-year contract in June 2016 after 14 games in charge of the national side.

Waikato, New Zealand
In September 2016, Herbert announced he was taking up a new coaching role as Director of Football for St Peter's, Cambridge, and as Technical Director for Cambridge FC, one of the biggest clubs in the Waikato region.
In May 2017, Herbert was announced as the head coach for Hamilton Wanderers AFC in the New Zealand Football Championship, providing him with a summer role that complements his winter coaching commitments.

Qualifications
Herbert holds a UEFA 'A' International Coaching Licence, and UEFA 'Pro' International Coaching Licence course that finished in June 2008.

Football academy
In 2014, Herbert established the Ricki Herbert Football Academy in New Zealand, providing coaching for boys and girls aged 4–17. By 2016, the academy was operating seven talent centres in New Zealand and had announced a partnership with Fulham, an English professional football club playing in the Championship.

Personal life
Herbert comes from a successful sporting family. His mother, Shirley, was a champion sprinter while his father, Clive, was a professional cyclist. His father was also a long-time football administrator, represented New Zealand as an official at the 1968 Summer Olympics in Mexico, and was a professional trainer of standardbred harness racing horses. Herbert's son, Kale, is a professional football coach, working as head coach for the Ricki Herbert Football Academy and as head coach for Hamilton Wanderers who play in the New Zealand Football Championship in New Zealand.

A biography of Herbert's life, A New Fire, written by Russell Gray, was published in New Zealand by Harper Collins in 2009.

Managerial statistics

New Zealand record

Player
New Zealand's goal tally first.

Manager
New Zealand's goal tally first.

International career statistics

Honours

Individual
New Zealand Young Player of the Year: 1980
New Zealand coach of the year: 2007, 2010
Companion of the New Zealand Order of Merit: 2011 New Year Honours

Club
Mt Wellington AFC
Chatham Cup: 1980, 1982
New Zealand Champions: 1980, 1982, 1986

Sydney Olympic FC
Australian National Soccer League Cup: 1983

As manager
Central United
Chatham Cup: 1997, 1998
New Zealand Champions: 1999
New Zealand
OFC Nations Cup: 2008

References

External links
 
 All Whites
 Wellington Phoenix FC
 Ricki Herbert Football Academy

1961 births
Living people
Association footballers from Auckland
New Zealand association footballers
Association football defenders
University-Mount Wellington players
Sydney Olympic FC players
Wolverhampton Wanderers F.C. players
National Soccer League (Australia) players
English Football League players
New Zealand international footballers
1982 FIFA World Cup players
New Zealand expatriate association footballers
New Zealand expatriate sportspeople in England
Expatriate footballers in England
New Zealand association football coaches
New Zealand national football team managers
Wellington Phoenix FC managers
NorthEast United FC managers
Maldives national football team managers
A-League Men managers
Indian Super League head coaches
2009 FIFA Confederations Cup managers
2010 FIFA World Cup managers
New Zealand expatriate association football managers
New Zealand expatriate sportspeople in India
New Zealand expatriate sportspeople in Papua New Guinea
New Zealand expatriate sportspeople in the Maldives
New Zealand expatriate sportspeople in Fiji
Expatriate football managers in India
Expatriate football managers in Papua New Guinea
Expatriate football managers in the Maldives
Expatriate football managers in Fiji
Companions of the New Zealand Order of Merit